The Clean Air Act may refer to:

 Clean Air Act 1956 in the United Kingdom
 Clean Air Act of 1963, as amended in the United States
 Clean Air Act 1972 in New Zealand

See also
 Air quality law
 Canadian Environmental Protection Act, 1999